James Alfred Williams (born April 29, 1947) is a former professional baseball outfielder who played for the San Diego Padres during the franchise's first two seasons. He batted and threw right-handed.

Career
Williams attended Harry Ells High School in Richmond, California. He was drafted by the Chicago Cubs in the 20th round of the  amateur draft. His career with Chicago peaked at the Class A level. Following the  season he was traded along with Paul Popovich to the Los Angeles Dodgers for Lou Johnson, where he played at the Class A and Class AA levels.

He was then drafted by the Padres during the 1968 expansion draft. The Padres assigned him to the Class AA Elmira Pioneers for the  season and called him up to the major league team that September, where he appeared in 13 games. He was sent back to the minor leagues the following season, and spent most of the season playing for the Class AAA Salt Lake Bees before being called back up to San Diego in September, appearing in another 11 games.

External links
, or Retrosheet, or Pura Pelota

1947 births
Living people
African-American baseball players
Albuquerque Dodgers players
Alexandria Aces players
American expatriate baseball players in Mexico
Arizona Instructional League Cubs players
Arizona Instructional League Dodgers players
Arizona Instructional League Pilots players
Bakersfield Dodgers players
Baseball players from Louisiana
Diablos Rojos del México players
Elmira Pioneers players
Leones de Yucatán players
Lodi Padres players
Major League Baseball outfielders
People from Zachary, Louisiana
Quincy Cubs players
Salt Lake City Bees players
San Diego Padres players
Tigres de Aragua players
American expatriate baseball players in Venezuela
Treasure Valley Cubs players
21st-century African-American people
20th-century African-American sportspeople